Grevillea biformis is a species of flowering plant in the family Proteaceae and is endemic to the south-west of Western Australia. It is a shrub with linear leaves and cylindrical clusters of creamy white or pale pink flowers.

Description

Taxonomy
Grevillea biformis was first formally described in 1848 by Carl Meissner in Johann Georg Christian Lehmann's Plantae Preissianae The specific epithet (biformis) means "two-leaved", referring to the two forms of leaves of this species.

In 1994, Peter M. Olde and Neil R. Marriott described two subspecies and the names are accepted by the Australian Plant Census:

Distribution and habitat
This grevillea grows in a variety of habitats from sandplain to mallee and is widespread in the south-west of Western Australia from near Shark Bay to Lake Grace and Hyden. Subspecies cymbiformis grows in low heath and is restricted to a small area near Eneabba.

Conservation status
Grevillea biformis is listed as "not threatened" by the Department of Biodiversity, Conservation and Attractions, but subsp. cymbiformis is classified as "Priority Three", meaning that it is poorly known and known from only a few locations but is not under imminent threat.

References

biformis
Flora of Western Australia
Proteales of Australia
Plants described in 1848
Taxa named by Carl Meissner